The Baltimore crisis was a diplomatic incident that took place between Chile and the United States, after the 1891 Chilean Civil War, as a result of the growing American influence in the Pacific Coast region of Latin America in the 1890s. It marked a dramatic shift in United States–Chile relations. The United States government demanded an apology. Chile ended the episode when it apologized and paid a $75,000 indemnity.

Escalating tensions
In 1884, Chile emerged from the War of the Pacific as a potential threat to the hegemony of the United States in the Western Hemisphere. The Chilean navy, then the strongest fleet in the Pacific, was able to confront American policy. In 1882, Chile refused US mediation in the War of the Pacific. During the Panama crisis of 1885, when the United States Navy occupied Colón, then part of Colombia, the Chilean government sent its most powerful protected cruiser (which represented a serious threat to the wooden American warships) to Panama City, and ordered it not to leave until after the American forces evacuated Colon.

By 1891, however, the equation had changed. The United States possessed more naval power and, more significantly, applied the theories of Alfred Thayer Mahan to secure the growing influence of the United States in Latin America.

During the Chilean Civil War, the American government supported the forces of President Jose Manuel Balmaceda and enforced a ban on exports for the congressional forces that was supported partially by the United Kingdom. Those and another circumstances troubled relations between the United States and the victorious congressional side, which defeated the presidential forces in 1891 to take power in Chile.

Just before the end of the Civil War, the United States sent a group of ships, including , to force the Chilean congressional cargo ship Itata, which had illegally loaded arms in San Diego for the congressional forces, to return to San Diego. The US ships reached Iquique before Itata. The new Chilean government ordered the ship back to San Diego to face outstanding charges.

During the war, the American-owned Central and South American Cable Company, by order of the Balmaceda administration, restored submarine telegraph cable service between Santiago and Lima, and sundered the cable connection to the congressional headquarters.

In addition, the United States minister in Santiago, Patrick Egan, gave diplomatic asylum to various insurgent congressional leaders during the war, and to Balmaceda's supporters after the war. The victorious side called upon Egan to surrender those supporters to them but was refused.

From the point of view of the congressionals, the United States had tried to stop them from purchasing weapons, denied them access to international telegraph traffic, spied on their troops, and refused to surrender war criminals.

USS Baltimore incident

On October 16, 1891, a mob attacked a group of sailors on shore leave from the cruiser USS Baltimore outside a bar in the Chilean port of Valparaíso after one of the American sailors spat on a picture of Arturo Prat, one of Chile's national heroes. Two sailors were killed and seventeen or eighteen were injured.

The new Chilean government initially rejected American protests. It denied responsibility, and the foreign minister attacked the U.S. US President Benjamin Harrison demanded full satisfaction as a point of honor and demanded $75,000 in reparations.  He issued an ultimatum and hinted at war.  European powers favored Chile; they recognized American dominance in the region and did not intervene.  Argentina and Peru, and to a lesser extent Brazil, had their own grievances against Chile and supported the U.S. Chile capitulated to Washington's terms, apologized, and paid $75,000 in gold. Afterward it built up its navy and its European connections.

See also
1891 Chilean Civil War

Notes

Further reading
 Devine, Michael. John W. Foster (The Ohio University Press, 1981)
 Goldberg, Joyce S. "Consent to Ascent. The Baltimore Affair and the US Rise to World Power Status." The Americas (1984): 21–35. in JSTOR
 Goldberg, Joyce S. The "Baltimore" Affair (Univ of Nebraska Press, 1986)
 
 Holbrook, Francis X., and John Nikol. "Chilean Crisis of 1891-1892." American Neptune 38.4 (1978): 291–300.
 Moore, John Bassett. "The Late Chilian Controversy" Political Science Quarterly, (1893) vol 8#3 pp: 467–94. in JSTOR
 Pike, Frederick B. Chile and the United States, 1880-1962: the emergence of Chile's social crisis and the challenge to United States diplomacy (1963) online
 Rice, Mark. "Transnational Business and US Diplomacy in Late Nineteenth-Century South America: WR Grace & Co. and the Chilean Crises of 1891." Journal of Latin American Studies 44.4 (2012): 765–792.

Primary sources
 Foreign Relations of the United States of America for the Year 1891. Washington, D.C.: GPO, 1892.
 Foreign Relations of the United States of America for the Year 1892. Washington, D.C.: GPO, 1893.
 The Federal Reporter. vv 47–9, 56
 Message of the President of the United States Respecting the Relations with Chile. Benjamin Harrison,  Washington, D.C.: GPO, 1892, 664 pp.
 Histamar sobre el tema 

History of the foreign relations of Chile
History of the foreign relations of the United States
1891 in Chile
Conflicts in 1891
Chile–United States relations
October 1891 events